The floral industry involves flower production, distribution, design, retailing, and other aspects of flower markets. Floriculture as an industry began in the late 19th century in the United Kingdom, where flowers were grown on a large scale on vast estates. The present day floral industry has achieved significant growth rates during the past few decades. In the 1950s, the global flower trade was less than 3 billion USD. By 1994, it had grown to 100 billion USD. In recent years, the floral industry has grown six percent annually, while the global trade volume in 2003 was 101.84 billion USD. 

The floral industry essentially consists of three major components: growers, wholesalers, and retailers. The recent trends are more towards eliminating intermediaries, the wholesalers between the growers and the retailers, to lower costs.

Transportation 
Some flowers are sent packed flat in boxes, enabling large amounts of flowers to be packed in small spaces like aircraft holds. Some other flowers are packed in pallets covered with a special grade of stretch film called Air-O film that allows air circulation in the pallets. Certain flowers cannot survive for long periods out of water such as orchids, gerberas (gerber daisies) and water lilies. These flowers are either sent with their own sealed water container (called picks) on each stem end - for more expensive or tropical flowers - or are transported in buckets of water (this method of transport in water is often referred to as "Procona"). The latter method extends the life of flowers and reduces labor time as flowers are ready for sale, but also reduces the amount of flowers that can be transported as they are much heavier than dry-packed flowers and hence air transportation charges are higher.

Flowers take a number of routes to the consumer, depending on where they are grown and how they are to be sold. Some growers cut and pack flowers at their nurseries, sending them directly out to the consumer by mail order. Some flowers are sent to packing companies, who grade the flowers and arrange them in bunches for sale to supermarkets or to deliver by mail order. Some flowers are graded and sleeved by the growers and sold at wholesale flower markets; the wholesalers then sell them on to florists who condition and arrange the flowers for the consumer.

The Netherlands and the history of the flower industry 

Traditionally, the center of flower production has been near their largest consumers: the developed world, where Japan, Western Europe and North America were both major producers and consumers. The major consumer markets being Germany (22 percent), the United States (15 percent), France (10 percent), the United Kingdom (10 percent), the Netherlands (9 percent), Japan (6 percent), Italy (5 percent), and Switzerland (5 percent).

The Tulip was actually originally a wild flower growing in Central Asia. It was first cultivated by the Turks as early as 1000AD. Mania in Turkey struck in the 16th century, at the time of the Ottoman Empire, when the Sultan demanded cultivation of particular blooms for his pleasure. Tulips became popular garden plants in the east and west, but, whereas the tulip in Turkish culture was a symbol of paradise on earth and had almost a divine status, in the Netherlands it represented the briefness of life.

The Netherlands remains the center of production for the European floral market, as well as a major international supplier to other continents. The flower auction at Aalsmeer is the largest  flower market in the world. Since the mid-1970s, the production and distribution of cut flowers in Netherlands has burgeoned. In 1995, Dutch growers produced over 8 billion blooms and the flower auctions collectively traded more than 5.4 billion euro (about $6.15 billion) in cut flowers and potted plants, contributing over 8 billion euro annually CBS:2011 to the Dutch balance of trade.

New flower growing centres 
Experts believe that the production focus has moved from traditional growers to countries where the climates are better and production and labor costs are lower. This has resulted in a paradigm shift in the floral industry. The Netherlands, for instance, has already shifted attention from flower production to flower trading, though it plays an important role still in the development of floricultural genetics. The new centers of production are typically developing countries like Ecuador (The Biggest producer and export of roses worldwide), Colombia (second largest exporter in the world and with a market of more than 40 years old), Ethiopia, Kenya,  and India. Other players in this global industry are Mexico, Israel, South Africa, Australia, Thailand and Malaysia. New Zealand, due to its position in the Southern Hemisphere, is a common source for seasonal flowers that are typically unavailable in Europe and the United States.

In Africa, Kenya is the largest exporter, supplying a large percentage of Europe's flowers. The industry there is represented by the Kenya Flower Council.

In North America, Mexico dedicated the third biggest land area in the world in 2019 (22,700 hectares ~ 56,092 acres, and growing) to the production of ornamental flowers. Despite that, only 5% of the total flower production is currently being exported, mostly to the United States, Canada, and Europe. However, the high technological development in most flower production centers, like Villa Guerrero, State of Mexico, make possible a world-class quality in flower production. The floral industry in Mexico, is represented at a national level by the Consejo Mexicano de la Flor (in English, Mexican Flower Council) but there are numerous organizations of flower growers or state and regional scope. The Asociación de Floricultores de Villa Guerrero A.C. (in English, Flower Growers Association of Villa Guerrero A.C.) internationally recognized by its acronym ASFLORVI, had a record of more than 700 flower grower members in 2019, making it the biggest flower grower association of Mexico. Mexico offers several advantages for flower companies in the United States and Canada in comparison to many already well known flower production countries like Colombia and Ecuador. Perhaps the biggest advantage is that the most important centers of massive flower production in Mexico, like Villa Guerrero (today known as Capital of the Flower in Mexico) are at only 653 miles, or approximately 13 hours driving from Laredo, Texas. This facilitates the all-season production of flowers from Mexico to be sent by highway to the United States, and that represents a significant logistical advantage for American and Canadian flower companies that import flowers from remote regions of the world relying exclusively on pricier aircraft transportation. Moreover, the currently underused Toluca International Airport is located at a highway distance of just 69.00 km (~ 42.87 mi) or one hour driving from Mexico's Flower Capital, making it yet a more competitive air freight option for the Canadian and American flower markets than any other flower growing country in the world. Since Mexico has already a free trade agreement with these nations (the USMCA) this could potentially be an opportunity to Mexico for stepping up as the main flower exporter to the United States, and Canada. Furthermore, Mexican illegal plantations of opium, marihuana, and coca are grown in lands that meet all the environmental conditions for ornamental flower growing, making it a valuable opportunity for the Mexican government to incentive flower growing productive projects for poor Mexican farmers whom most of the time grow illegal crops as their only alternative to subsist. This would allow Mexico to address some of the main causes of its illegal narcotic production and possibly reduce the rampant violence of the Mexican drug war.

In South America, Colombia is the leading flower producer and exporter accounting for 59% of all flowers imported to The United States in 2006. The United States imports 82% of its flowers.  Growers in the United States state that 3 out of 4 flowers in the United States are grown outside the US with Colombia being the biggest exporter.  The United States signed a free trade agreement with Colombia and that has lowered the cost of Colombian flowers in the United States. Ecuador has become, in recent years, the leading South American rose producer and is well known throughout the world for its high quality, large headed roses due to the high altitude location of its rose farms.

Companies
 Bill Doran Company (USA)
Florists' Transworld Delivery (FTD) (USA)
 Teleflora (USA)
 1800 Flowers (USA)
 more florist companies by category

Trade organizations
 Royal FloraHolland
 Society of American Florists
 Produce Marketing Association
 British Florist Association
 more florist organizations by category

See also
Slow Flowers
Dutch flower bucket

References

External links
 Overview of Floral Industry
 Flower Ethics -  How deep is your love?
 Sala Floral

 
19th-century establishments in the United Kingdom
Floristry
Industries (economics)